The Gouritz River Bridge on the N2 route between Cape Town and Port Elizabeth is a rigid-frame bridge which crosses the Gouritz River   west of Mossel Bay in the Western Cape.

Structural design
The reinforced concrete deck together with two pairs of inclined supports at eastern and western sides of the river form a rigid frame structure. The deck superstructure consists of a continuous prestressed concrete box girder with deck slabs cantilevered laterally to design width.

Gallery

External links
 

Bridges in South Africa
Bridges completed in 1978
Concrete bridges